The statue of Henry Bartle Frere is an outdoor 1888 sculpture of the British colonial administrator of the same name, installed at Whitehall Gardens in London, United Kingdom. The statue is by the sculptor Thomas Brock and is Grade II listed.

See also
 1888 in art
 List of public art in the City of Westminster

References

External links
 
 Statue: Sir Henry Bartle Frere at London Remembers

1888 establishments in England
1888 sculptures
Frere, Henry Bartle
Monuments and memorials in London
Outdoor sculptures in London
Sculptures by Thomas Brock
Sculptures of men in the United Kingdom
Victoria Embankment